Xingzhou may refer to:

Xing Prefecture (Hebei) (邢州), a prefecture between 6th and 13th centuries in modern Hebei, China
Xing Prefecture (Shaanxi) (興州), a prefecture between 6th and 13th centuries in modern Shaanxi, China
Xing Prefecture (Ningxia) (興州), a prefecture in 11th-century Western Xia in modern Ningxia, China

See also
Singapore, a southeast Asian country sometimes called Xingzhou (星洲) in Chinese
Seongju County, a county in North Gyeongsang Province, South Korea
Xing (disambiguation)